El Buur is a district in the central Galguduud region of Somalia. Its oldest and formal capital city of galgaduud region. The city's population is from the Hawiye clan which is the largest somali clan and descendants of Samaale.

References

External links
 Districts of Somalia
 Administrative map of El Buur District

Districts of Somalia

Galguduud